Hacıköprü is a village in the Şahinbey District, Gaziantep Province, Turkey. The village had a population of  137 in 2022 and is inhabited by Turkmens of the Afshar tribe. The inhabitants are Alevis and belong to the Hacım Sultan ocak.

References

Villages in Şahinbey District